Rineloricaria jurupari is a species of catfish in the family Loricariidae. It is native to South America, where it occurs in the upper Vaupés River, which is part of the Amazon River basin, in Colombia. The species reaches 9.45 cm (3.7 inches) in standard length. It was described in 2018 by Alejandro Londoño-Burbano (of the Federal University of Rio de Janeiro) and Alexander Urbano-Bonilla (of the Pontifical Xavierian University) on the basis of its distinctive morphology and coloration. FishBase does not yet list this species.

References 

Loricariini
Catfish of South America
Freshwater fish of Colombia
Fish described in 2018